"Don't You Want Me" is a song recorded by British DJ and producer Francis Wright, known under the pseudonym of Felix, released in July 1992 as his debut single from his album, #1 (1993). Musically, it samples Jomanda's "Don't You Want My Love" and credited as Felix featuring Jomanda (remixed by Rollo and Red Jerry). Released on 27 July 1992, the song reached number six on the UK Singles Chart reached number one in Finland, Spain, and Switzerland. It also went to number one on the US Billboard Hot Dance Club Play chart and on the European Hot 100 Singles chart. In 1995 and 1996, the song charted in the UK again, but in remixed form. British magazine Mixmag ranked the song number 98 in its "100 Greatest Dance Singles Of All Time" list in 1996.

Background
This song is largely considered to be the track that launched the hardbag explosion. It appears on the compilation The Best Dance Album in the World... Ever! in remixed form, and was used in the episode "New Girl" of the TV series The Office. It was also famously featured in St George, a 1996 Tango Blackcurrant advertisement for television. On the single re-release, which features the version from the advert which also samples dialogue from the advert, the Tango Blackcurrant logo even appears several times on the artwork.

Critical reception
Upon the release of the 1992 version, Larry Flick from Billboard found that "requisite harsh synths are tempered with a retro, Giorgio Moroder-esque electro-beat". A reviewer from Music & Media wrote about the 1995 remix, "In the Deconstruction Classic series, here's Patrick Prins' remix interpretation of Felix's 1992 dance hit. It's much heavier now with souped up sequencers and percussion." British magazine Music Week described the first version as a "hand-waving progressive house anthem". Kris Needs from NME remarked its "nuclear-fuelled muscle riff", commenting, "Described as 'the keyboard riff from hell, once heard it can't be dislodged', I swear the middle breakdown where the girl comes back with that don'tyawantmalove? was going to spark mass levitation at Nottingham Venus! James Hamilton from the RM Dance Update declared it as a "distinctive organ/synth driven" track.

Impact and legacy
British hardhouse and trance music record producer Jon the Dentist picked "Don't You Want Me" as one of his favourites in 1995, adding, "When this came out we finally got some technoey sounds back after two years of drongo discoey sounds. It was how I got into hardcore. Felix was a groundbreaker, he finally got the house back on its track."

British magazine Mixmag ranked the song number 98 in its "100 Greatest Dance Singles Of All Time" list in 1996.

Track listings

 12" maxi
 "Don't You Want Me" (Hooj Mix) – 5:58
 "Don't You Want Me" (Red Jerry's Holiday Mix) – 4:39
 "Don't You Want Me" (Fierce Mix) – 5:07

 12" maxi
 "Don't You Want Me" (Hooj Mix) – 5:58
 "Don't You Want Me" (Original) – 4:43
 "Yes You Do" – 4:47

 7" single / CD single
 "Don't You Want Me" (Hooj Mix Edit) – 3:11
 "Don't You Want Me" (Original Mix) – 4:53

 CD maxi
 "Don't You Want Me" (Hooj Mix Edit) – 3:11
 "Don't You Want Me" (Hooj Mix) – 5:58
 "Don't You Want Me" (Red Jerry's Holiday Mix) – 4:39
 "Don't You Want Me" (Fierce Mix) – 5:07

 CD maxi
 "Don't You Want Me" (Hooj Mix Edit) – 3:11
 "Don't You Want Me" (Hooj Mix) – 5:58
 "Don't You Want Me" (Original Mix) – 4:53
 "Don't You Want Me" (Red Jerry's Holiday Mix) – 4:40
 "Don't You Want Me" (Fierce Mix) – 5:06

 Cassette
 "Don't You Want Me" (Hooj Mix Edit)
 "Don't You Want Me" (Original Mix)
 "Don't You Want Me" (Hooj Mix Edit)
 "Don't You Want Me" (Original Mix)

 CD maxi - 1995 remixes
 "Don't You Want Me (Patrick Prins Remix Edit) – 3:23
 "Don't You Want Me (Hooj Mix Edit) – 3:11
 "Don't You Want Me (Patrick Prins Remix) – 6:17
 "Don't You Want Me (Hooj Mix) – 5:53
 "Don't You Want Me (DJ Professor Mix) – 7:54
 "Don't You Want Me (Candy Girls Remix) – 7:30

 12" maxi - 1995 remixes
 "Don't You Want Me" (Patrick Prins Remix) – 6:17
 "Don't You Want Me" (Candy Girls Remix) – 7:30
 "Don't You Want Me" (Hooj Mix) – 5:53
 "Don't You Want Me" (DJ Professor Mix) – 7:54

 CD maxi - 1996 remixes
 "Don't You Want Me" (Remix '96 Pugilist Mix) – 3:40
 "Stars" (Felix Mix Edit) – 3:37
 "It Will Make Me Crazy" (Big Mix Edit) – 3:52
 "Don't You Want Me" (Hooj Mix) – 5:58

 Digital Downloading - 2015 remixes
 "Don't You Want Me" (Dimitri Vegas & Like Mike remix) – 5:07
 "Don't You Want Me" (Atjazz remix) – 6:35
 "Don't You Want Me" (Brodanse Bass Hall remix) – 6:35

 Digital Downloading - Timmy Trumpet remix
 "Don't You Want Me" (Timmy Trumpet x Felix) - TBA

Charts and sales

Weekly charts

Year-end charts

Certifications

Cover versions
A remix of the song "Don't You Want Me (Pugilist Mix)" formed the soundtrack to the multi award-winning TV commercial for Blackcurrant Tango.
In 2005, Crazy Frog made its own version of the song, available on the album More Crazy Hits.
In 2007, it was sampled by Meck to provide the majority of the music for his single "Feels Like Home". In 2008, Madonna used elements of Meck's version during "Like a Prayer" on the Sticky & Sweet Tour.
The song was also covered by Belgian jazz musician Jef Neve as part of the soundtrack for the movie adaptation of Dimitri Verhulst's De Helaasheid der Dingen.
In 2011, David Guetta used the track for the basis of the radio remix for Snoop Dogg's single "Sweat (Wet)".

References

1992 songs
1992 singles
1995 singles
1996 singles
Felix (musician) songs
Deconstruction Records singles
Music Week number-one dance singles
Number-one singles in Finland
Number-one singles in Spain
Number-one singles in Switzerland
Tango (drink)